The 1983–84 West Midlands (Regional) League season was the 84th in the history of the West Midlands (Regional) League, an English association football competition for semi-professional and amateur teams based in the West Midlands county, Shropshire, Herefordshire, Worcestershire and southern Staffordshire.

Premier Division

The Premier Division featured 17 clubs which competed in the division last season, along with three new clubs:
Chasetown, promoted from Division One
Cradley Town, transferred from the Midland Combination
GKN Sankeys, promoted from Division One

Also, Bilston was renamed Bilston Town.

League table

References

External links

1983–84
8